Pussey! is a comics serial and graphic novel by Daniel Clowes. It was originally serialized across nine non-consecutive issues of Clowes's alternative comic book Eightball, and was later collected by Fantagraphics Books.

Pussey! tells the satirical story of a comic book artist named Dan Pussey, following him from his childhood years, through his successful career and into aged obscurity. Along the way he lampoons the comics industry as a whole, including direct satires of several creators, such art Art Spiegelman stand-in character Gummo Bubbleman.

Dave Gilson, writing for Mother Jones, called Pussey! a "knowing send-up of comic nerddom", and Tom Spurgeon of The Comics Reporter said that "works like Pussey...remind that he may also be its best living practitioner of filthy, blunt satire".

Cultural references
 In the final episode of The IT Crowd ("The Internet Is Coming" Special, broadcast in September 2013), Jen Barber is seen reading the Fantagraphics Books book of the series

References

1989 comics debuts
1994 comics endings
Comics about comics
Satirical comics
1995 graphic novels
Comics by Daniel Clowes
Comics set in the United States
Fantagraphics titles
Fictional cartoonists
Male characters in comics
Novels first published in serial form